Christian Tafdrup (born 8 April 1978) is a Danish actor, film director, and screenwriter. As a director, he is best known for his directorial debut Parents (2016) that won the 2017 Robert Award for Best Director, as well as his critically acclaimed psychological thriller horror drama Speak No Evil (2022).

Filmography

As actor

As director and screenwriter

Selected awards

References

External links 
 

1978 births
Living people
20th-century Danish male actors
21st-century Danish male actors
21st-century Danish male writers
21st-century Danish screenwriters
Danish film producers
Danish male film actors
Danish male screenwriters
Film directors from Copenhagen
Male actors from Copenhagen